Messy may refer to:

Places
 Messy, Seine-et-Marne, France, a commune

People
 Messy Marv, stage name of American rapper Marvin Watson Jr. (born 1976)
 Harry Messy, Canadian ice hockey player
 the title fictional character of Mr. Messy, a book in the Mr. Men series

Music
 "Messy", a 2017 song by Fifth Harmony from Fifth Harmony
 "Messy", a 2018 song by Kiiara

Other
 Messy Church, informal Christian activity for families

See also
 Messi (disambiguation)
 Messe (disambiguation)
 Massy (disambiguation)